Intelsat 704 (also known as IS-704 and Intelsat 7-F4) is a geostationary communication satellite that was built by Space Systems/Loral (SSL). It is located in the orbital position of 29.5 degrees east longitude and it is currently in an inclined orbit. The same is owned by Intelsat and after sold to SES World Skies on November 30, 1998. The satellite was based on the LS-1300 platform and its estimated useful life was 15 years.

The satellite was successfully launched into space on January 10, 1995, at 06:18, using an Atlas II vehicle from the Cape Canaveral Air Force Station, United States. It had a launch mass of 3,695 kg.

The Intelsat 704 is equipped with 26 transponders in C band and 10 in Ku band to provide broadcasting, business-to-home services, telecommunications, VSATnetworks.

Specifications 
 Apogee: 
 Perigee: 
 Semimajor axis: 
 Orbital inclination: 6.9°
 Orbital period: 24,54 hours
 Propulsion: R-4D-11
 Power: 5 transponders of 35 W and 5 transponders of 50 W
 Bandwidth: 6 transponders of 72 MHz and 4 transponders of 112 MHz
 EIRP: Spot 1: 45.4 dBW, Spot 2: 44.5 dBW, and Spot 3: 46 dBW
 Polarization: Linear
 Beacons: 11.701 GHz, 12.501 GHz (linear)11.198 GHz, 11.452 GHz (RHCP)
 Frequency: Downlink 10.95-11.20 GHz, 11.45-11.70 GHz,11.70-11.95 GHz, and 12.50-12.75 GHz

External links 
 Intelsat 704 TBS satellite
 Intelsat 7 Gunter's Space Page
 Intelsat 704 SatBeams

Spacecraft launched in 1995
Intelsat satellites
Spacecraft decommissioned in 2009